In the Name of the Son can refer to:

 In the Name of the Son (2007 film), a 2007 short film
 In the Name of the Son (2012 film), a 2012 Belgian film